The Liyang railway station is a high-speed railway station on the Ninghang Passenger Railway. The station is located in Liyang, Jiangsu, China.

The Liyang railway station is located 5 kilometres south of downtown Liyang. The construction of the railway station began on July 21, 2010. It was opened on July 1, 2013, simultaneously with the opening of the Nanjing–Hangzhou Passenger Railway line.

The railway station takes a total area of 7983 square meters and has 2 platforms. The main building of the train station measures 141.4 meters in length, 38.3 meters in width, and 18 meters high.

References 

Railway stations in Jiangsu
Railway stations in China opened in 2013